Orlovo is a village in the municipality of Haskovo, in Haskovo Province, in southern Bulgaria.

Geography 
Orlovo is located 12 km southeast of Haskovo. The altitude of the village is 220 m.

References

Villages in Haskovo Province